The Vice President of the Republic of the Gambia is the second highest political position in the Gambia. The office was created in April 1970, with the passing of the republican Constitution of the Gambia following the republic referendum. The Vice President is appointed by the President and acts as constitutional successor of the president in the event of a vacancy.

The current Vice President is Muhammad B.S. Jallow, who was appointed on 24 February 2023 following the death of his predecessor Badara Joof.

List of vice presidents

See also
Politics of the Gambia
President of the Gambia
List of heads of state of the Gambia

Notes

References

1970 establishments in the Gambia
Government of the Gambia
Gambia